Movin' & Groovin' is the debut album by American jazz pianist Horace Parlan featuring performances recorded and released on the Blue Note label in 1960.

Reception
The Allmusic review by Stephen Thomas Erlewine states, "Movin' and Groovin' is a thoroughly impressive affair, establishing Parlan as a distinctive hard bop stylist... Everything swings, no matter the tempo, and the end result is a fine debut from a distinctive pianist".

Track listing
 "C Jam Blues" (Barney Bigard, Duke Ellington) - 5:13
 "On Green Dolphin Street" - (Bronislau Kaper, Ned Washington) - 5:30
 "Up in Cynthia's Room" (Horace Parlan) - 5:26
 "Lady Bird" (Tadd Dameron) - 5:03
 "Bags' Groove" (Milt Jackson) - 5:48
 "Stella by Starlight" (Ned Washington, Victor Young) - 6:04
 "There Is No Greater Love" (Isham Jones, Marty Symes) - 6:43
 "It Could Happen to You" (Johnny Burke, Jimmy Van Heusen) - 3:18

Personnel
Horace Parlan - piano
Sam Jones - bass
Al Harewood - drums

References

Blue Note Records albums
Horace Parlan albums
1960 debut albums
Albums produced by Alfred Lion
Albums recorded at Van Gelder Studio